René Colas (26 July 190116 October 1984) was a French cinematographer whose parents collaborated with Georges Méliès at the time of his birth.

Filmography 

 1926 : The Nude Woman by Léonce Perret
 1928 : The Orchid Dancer by Léonce Perret
 1928 : Morgane la sirène by Léonce Perret
 1930 : L'Escale by Jean Gourguet
 1930 : L'Arlésienne by Jacques de Baroncelli
 1930 : My Childish Father by Jean de Limur
 1930 : Levy and Company by André Hugon
 1930 : La Femme et le Rossignol by André Hugon
 1932 : Paris-Méditerranée by Joe May 
 1932 : Fun in the Barracks by Maurice Tourneur
 1933 : Toto de Jacques Tourneur
 1933 : Charlemagne by Pierre Colombier
 1933 : Knock by Roger Goupillières and Louis Jouvet
 1934 : A Man Has Been Stolen by Max Ophüls
 1934 : Le Centenaire, short film by Pierre-Jean Ducis 
 1934 : The Uncle from Peking by Jacques Darmont
 1934 : Primerose by René Guissart
 1935 : Jim la Houlette by André Berthomieu
 1935 :    by Maurice Tourneur
 1935 : Crime and Punishment by Pierre Chenal
 1936 : Tout va très bien madame la marquise by Henry Wulschleger
 1936 : Samson by Maurice Tourneur
 1937 : The Ladies in the Green Hats by Maurice Cloche
 1937 : À nous deux, madame la vie by René Guissart and Yves Mirande
 1938 : Le Cantinier de la coloniale by Henry Wulschleger
 1938 : Sommes-nous défendus ? by Jean Loubignac (in collaboration with Hervé Missir, Charles Barrois, Gaston Chelle)
 1938 : Gargousse by Henry Wulschleger
 1941 : Volpone by Maurice Tourneur
 1942 : Pension Jonas by Pierre Caron
 1943 : La Chèvre d'or by René Barberis
 1946 : Le Gardian by Jean de Marguenat
 1945 : Blondine by Henri Mahé
 1946 : Madame et son flirt by Jean de Marguenat
 1948 : The Woman I Murdered, by Jacques Daniel-Norman
 1949 : My Aunt from Honfleur by René Jayet
 1949 : Jo la Romance by Gilles Grangier
 1950 : La Maison du printemps by Jacques Daroy
 1950 : Le Gang des tractions-arrière by Jean Loubignac
 1951 : Piédalu à Paris by Jean Loubignac
 1952 : Piédalu fait des miracles by Jean Loubignac
 1952 : Foyer perdu by Jean Loubignac
 1953 : Des quintuplés au pensionnat by René Jayet
 1954 : Ah! Les belles bacchantes by Jean Loubignac
 1955 : Arthur Honegger, short film by Georges Rouquier
 1959 : Marche ou crève'' by Georges Lautner

References

External links 
 

Cinematographers from Paris
1901 births
1984 deaths